Sheger Park (Amharic: ሸገር ፓርክ), also known as Friendship Park, is the biggest urban park in Addis Ababa, Ethiopia. The park is right next to Unity Park which holds inside it a zoo, and historical archives. The park sister park unity park was opened by Prime Minister Abiy Ahmed with foreign heads of state and government such as the presidents of Uganda, Kenya, Somalia, and prime minister of Sudan. Sheger park was opened on 10 September 2020, seeing high level Ethiopian government ministers, the president, and the prime minister and first lady herself seen in the opening ceremony.

Park 
The park is located in the political center of Addis Ababa where government offices as the Prime Minister and parliament are next to and close by. The park has an artificial lake, a square to gather and also water fountain lights at nighttime. It also contains lots of flowers with diverse species of flora. It is to note that such a project has helped Addis Ababa to greenify more and help Addis Ababa as a city enter Bloomberg's "Best Climate Projects" for a competing to enter into 2022 C40 Cities Bloomberg Philanthropies Awards in the future.

References 

Parks in Africa